Sand Branch is a stream in Platte County in the U.S. state of Missouri. It is a tributary of Prairie Creek.

Sand Branch was so named on account of the sandy character of the creek bed.

See also
List of rivers of Missouri

References

Rivers of Platte County, Missouri
Rivers of Missouri